Constance Williams Walton (30 June 1919 – 22 July 2017) was an American composer, pianist, and teacher.

Walton was born in California to Milo B. and Helen W. Williams. She graduated from the Philadelphia Conservatory of Music and married Donald Rech Walton on June 14, 1941. They had one son, Robert, before divorcing in November 1965.

While teaching in Old Greenwich, Connecticut, Walton served as chair of the National Federation of Music Clubs' Northeastern Region. She won several awards:

National Opera Association Award (1972)
National Federation of Music Clubs Adult Composer Award (1977)
Greenwich Pen Women OWL Award (1992)

Walton's compositions included:

CHAMBER 

Bare Branches (flute, viola and cello)
Perspective (cello and piano) 
Shadows (viola and cello)

PIANO 

Duo Dimensions (two pianos)
Three Designs for Piano

VOCAL 

"Four Little Songs"
Songs

References 

American composers
American women composers
1919 births
2017 deaths
University of the Arts (Philadelphia) alumni
21st-century American women